The Church of Jesus Christ of Latter-day Saints (LDS Church) releases membership, congregational, and related information on a regular basis. The latest membership information LDS Church releases includes a count of membership, stakes, wards, branches, missions, temples, and family history centers for the worldwide church and for individual countries and territories where the church is recognized. The latest information released was as of December 31, 2021 for the worldwide church, and December 31, 2019 for individual countries and selected territories.

At the end of 2021, the LDS Church had 31,315 congregations and a reported membership of 16,805,400.

Membership defined 
The LDS Church defines membership as a count of living individuals who:
 have been baptized and confirmed.
 are under age nine and have been blessed but not baptized.
 are not accountable because of intellectual disabilities, regardless of age.
 are unblessed children under age eight when:
 two member parents request it; or
 one member parent requests it and the nonmember parent gives permission.

After baptism, blessing, or parental request stated above, membership must be recorded and maintained by the church to have and keep membership.

Membership considerations 
In 2005, Peggy Fletcher Stack, longtime religion columnist for The Salt Lake Tribune, estimated that about one-third of the reported LDS membership was "active" (i.e., regularly attending church services and participating in other expected meetings and obligations). In 2005, this would have amounted to approximately 4 million active members among a worldwide LDS population of 12 million. Active membership varied from a high of 40 to 50 percent in congregations in North America and the Pacific Islands, to a low of about 25 percent in Latin America. Fletcher Stack's data was compiled from several sources, including a 2001 survey of religious affiliation by scholars at City University of New York and a demographer at LDS-owned Brigham Young University.

In 2003, church leader Dallin H. Oaks, noted that among recent converts "attrition is sharpest in the two months after baptism", which he attributed in part to difficulties adapting to the church's dietary code, the Word of Wisdom, that prohibits the use of alcohol, tobacco, coffee, and tea. In 2001, sociologist Armand Mauss estimated that about 50 percent of LDS converts in the US stopped attending church within a year of baptism, while outside the US the rate was about 70 percent.

Countries 
The tables on this section represents Latter-day Saint membership, as reported by the LDS Church, as of December 31, 2021. Except where indicated, general population figures are based on the latest CIA estimates (primarily for July 2022). Percentages of LDS members were calculated with this information. The link under the names of each country, territory, etc. corresponds to brief LDS history and statistical information for that particular area.

Congregations 

Notes
This does not include member groups. Only congregations organized as ward or branch.
2019 membership not released for country or territory. Estimated 2015 membership information was used instead.
2019 membership not released for country or territory. 2018 membership and congregational information was used instead.
An estimated mid-year 2018 membership and congregational information was used for Mainland China.
2019 membership not released for country or territory. 2017 membership and congregational information was used instead.
2016 membership data and population was used for Russia, the last year the church released membership data for the country.
 *There are several areas that cover the US and Canada. This includes North America Central, North America Northeast, North America Southeast, North America Southwest, North America West, and Utah areas. Bermuda is in the North America Northeast area.
 **Ukraine and Moldova are the only countries not assigned to an area and are administered by an authority in the Europe North Area.

Members and growth 

Notes
This does not include member groups, only congregations organized as ward or branch.
2021 membership not released for country or territory. Estimated 2015 membership information was used instead.
2021 membership not released for country or territory. 2018 membership and congregational information was used instead.
Estimated membership information was used for Mainland China.
2021 membership not released for country or territory. 2017 membership and congregational information was used instead.
2016 membership data and population was used for Russia, the last year the church released membership data for the country.
 *There are several areas that cover the US and Canada.  This includes North America Central, North America Northeast, North America Southeast, North America Southwest, North America West, and Utah areas. Bermuda is in the North America Northeast area.
 **Ukraine and Moldova are the only countries not assigned to an area and are administered by an authority in the Europe North Area.

Distribution maps

Membership

Percent members

Congregations

Areas

Temples

See also 

Membership history of the Church of Jesus Christ of Latter-day Saints
Membership statistics of the Church of Jesus Christ of Latter-day Saints (United States).
Membership statistics of the Church of Jesus Christ of Latter-day Saints (Canada).
Mormons
Mormonism

References

External links 
 adherents.com
 Worldmapper
 LDS Church Almanac

Religious demographics
The Church of Jesus Christ of Latter-day Saints by region
Membership statistics